Chen Kunshan (born 1 October 1960) is a Taiwanese scientist. He is a fellow of the Institute of Electrical and Electronics Engineers (IEEE).

Biography
Chen was born and raised in Taichung City, Taiwan. He graduated from National Taipei University of Technology and National Taiwan University of Science and Technology. He received a doctoral degree in motor learning from University of Texas at Arlington in 1990.

Chen returned to Taiwan in 1992, and worked at National Central University, he was an editor of IEEE Transactions on Geoscience and Remote Sensing, Journal of Electromagnetic Waves and Applications, and Journal of Aerospace.

Chen became a professor at National Central University in August 1996.

In 2006, he was elected a fellow of the Institute of Electrical and Electronics Engineers (IEEE).

In September 2013, he abandoned his job at Taiwan's National Central University and moved to Beijing and worked at the Chinese Academy of Sciences. His action triggered national security concerns in Taiwan.

References

1960 births
Living people
Taiwanese electrical engineers
Fellow Members of the IEEE
National Taipei University of Technology alumni
National Taiwan University of Science and Technology alumni
University of Texas at Arlington alumni
Academic staff of the National Central University
Taiwanese expatriates in China
Scientists from Taichung
21st-century Taiwanese scientists
20th-century Taiwanese scientists
20th-century Taiwanese educators
21st-century Taiwanese educators
Taiwanese expatriates in the United States
Academic journal editors